Elections for the East Lothian Council took place in May 1988, alongside elections to the councils of Scotland's various other districts.

Ward Results

Labour
 Musselburgh East
 Musselburgh Central
 Musselburgh South
 Musselburgh West
 Tranent/Ormiston
 Carberry
 Prestonpans West
 Cockenzie
 Prestonpans East
 Gladsmuir
 Lammermuir
 Dunbar

Conservative
 Haddington
 Direleton
 East Linton
 North Berwick

Independent Labour
 Tranent North

References

1988
1988 Scottish local elections